IBM Web-based System Manager (WSM) is a management software (GUI) for administering AIX 5L host on RS/6000 systems, it can be run in standalone mode or in a client-server environment.

Introduced in AIX 4.3 and installed by default in AIX 5.1 if there is a graphical adapter in the machine at time of installation.

See also
 IBM AIX SMIT
 IBM Systems Director Console for AIX
 IBM Hardware Management Console

Unix configuration utilities